Sebastopol is the first solo studio album by Jay Farrar. It was released in 2001 on Artemis Records.

Track listing

Personnel
 Jay Farrar – guitars, lead vocals, piano, Roland keyboard, tambura
 Jon Wurster – drums, percussion
 Tom Ray – bass
 Matt Pence – drums, percussion
 Steve Drodze – piano, Roland & Ensoniq keyboards, melodica, backing vocals
 Gillian Welch – vocals (4)
 David Rawlings – acoustic guitar, lap steel guitar (4)
 Dade Farrar – bowed stand-up bass (6)
 John Agnello – electric guitar, percussion (7)
 Lou Winer – saxophone (16)
 Kelly Joe Phelps – slide guitar (14)

References

2001 debut albums
Artemis Records albums
Alternative country albums by American artists